Trimaximal mixing (also known as threefold maximal mixing) refers to the highly symmetric, maximally CP-violating,  fermion mixing configuration, characterised by a unitary matrix having all its elements equal in modulus
() as may be written, e.g.:

where  and  
are the complex cube roots of unity. The Jarlskog -violating parameter  takes its extremal value .

Originally proposed as a candidate lepton mixing matrix, and actively studied as such (and even as a candidate quark mixing matrix), trimaximal mixing is now definitively ruled-out as a phenomenologically viable lepton mixing scheme by neutrino oscillation experiments, especially the Chooz reactor experiment, in favour of the no longer tenable (related) tribimaximal mixing scheme.

References

Leptons
Standard Model
Particle physics
Neutrinos